Dilomilis is a genus of orchids, (family Orchidaceae), consisting of five species in the Greater Antilles.

The genus is named for its bicallose lip.

 Dilomilis bissei H.Dietr. - Cuba
 Dilomilis elata (Benth.) Summerh. - Cuba, Jamaica
 Dilomilis montana (Sw.) Summerh. - Cuba, Jamaica, Dominican Republic, Puerto Rico
 Dilomilis oligophylla (Schltr.) Summerh. - Cuba
 Dilomilis scirpoidea (Schltr.) Summerh. - Dominican Republic

References

 Nir, M. Orchidaceae Antillanae, 94–97, 2000.

Pleurothallidinae
Flora of the Caribbean
Pleurothallidinae genera
Taxa named by Constantine Samuel Rafinesque